Nepenthes appendiculata is a tropical pitcher plant known only from the Hose Mountains of central Sarawak, Borneo, where it grows at elevations of 1450–1700 m above sea level. The species is characterised by an enlarged glandular appendage on the lower lid surface, for which it is named.

References

 Lee, C.C. 2012. New Pitcher Plant Discoveries. Jungle Notes, February 2, 2012. 

appendiculata
Carnivorous plants of Asia
Endemic flora of Borneo
Plants described in 2011
Flora of the Borneo montane rain forests